Mother & Child is an abstract sculpture by Sorel Etrog.

Exhibitions

There are three examples of this sculpture on display in the United States:
 At the University of Chicago in Chicago, IL.
 At the Franklin D. Murphy Sculpture Garden at the University of California, Los Angeles in  Los Angeles, CA.
 At the Annmarie Sculpture Garden in Solomons, MD.

Citations

References

 
 
 

Abstract art
Bronze sculptures in California
Bronze sculptures in Illinois
Bronze sculptures in Maryland
Buildings and structures completed in 1962